The 1958 Toronto Argonauts finished in fourth place in the Interprovincial Rugby Football Union with a 4–10 record and failed to make the playoffs.

Regular season

Standings

Schedule

References

Toronto Argonauts seasons
1958 Canadian Football League season by team